Virginia's 20th House of Delegates district elects one of 100 seats in the Virginia House of Delegates, the lower house of the state's bicameral legislature. District 20 consists of parts of Augusta County and Nelson County; Highland County; and the cities of Staunton and Waynesboro. It has been represented by Republican Dickie Bell since 2010.

District officeholders

Results

References

External links
 

Virginia House of Delegates districts
Augusta County, Virginia
Nelson County, Virginia
Highland County, Virginia
Staunton, Virginia
Waynesboro, Virginia